A pork chop, like other meat chops, is a loin cut taken perpendicular to the spine of the pig and is usually a rib or part of a vertebra. Pork chops are unprocessed and leaner than other cuts. Chops are commonly served as an individual portion, and can be accompanied with applesauce, vegetables, and other sides. Pork is one of the most commonly consumed meats in the world. In the United States, pork chops are the most commonly consumed meat cut from the pork loin and account for 10% of total pork consumption.

Variations
The center cut or pork loin chop includes a large T-shaped bone and is structurally similar to the beef T-bone steak. Rib chops come from the rib portion of the loin, and are similar to rib eye steaks. Blade or shoulder chops come from the spine and tend to contain much connective tissue. The sirloin chop is taken from the (rear) leg end and also contains much connective tissue. The shoulder end produces chops that are considerably fattier than the chops taken from the loin end. 

The "Iowa Chop" is a large thick center cut with its name coined in 1976 by the Iowa Pork Producers Association due to the state producing more pork than any other in the nation.

A "Bacon Chop" is cut from the shoulder end and leaves the pork belly meat attached. Pork chops are sometimes sold marinated, or they can be prepared at home to add flavor; marinades such as a chili sauce or a barbecue sauce are common.  As pork is often cooked more thoroughly than beef, thus running the risk of drying out, pork chops can be brined to maintain moistness. One could also wrap pork chops in bacon to add further moistness during the cooking process.

Preparation
Pork chops are suitable for roasting, grilling, or frying, but there are also stuffed recipes. They can be used boneless or bone-in. Improved breeding techniques have made it possible to cook pork to a lower temperature, helping it to remain juicy, while still being safe to eat.

It is a versatile cut of meat, which can be transformed into many different dishes and recipes.

See also

 List of pork dishes

References

Citations

Bibliography

External links

 USDA Fresh Pork from Farm to Table

Cuts of pork
American pork dishes